Maritime National Fish Ltd v Ocean Trawlers Ltd [1935] UKPC 1, is a case on the subject of frustration of purpose, specifically establishing that foreseeable or self-induced frustration will not render a contract frustrated.

Facts
In October 1932, Maritime National Fish contracted to hire St. Cuthbert, a steam trawler fitted with an otter trawl, from Ocean Trawlers Ltd. The hire was to last for twelve months. Both parties knew that the use of such a vessel without a license from the Minister was illegal, under the Fisheries Act (c. 73 Revised Statutes of Canada) 1927. Subsequently, Maritime National Fish applied for five licenses from the Canadian government, for the five trawlers they were using. However, only three were granted. Maritime National Fish did not name the St. Cuthbert from Ocean Trawlers as one of the licensed vessels, and refused to go through with the hire, on the grounds the contract was frustrated. At first instance, Maritime National Fish prevailed, the trial judge holding that it was "not unreasonable to imply a condition to the effect that if the law prohibits the operation of this boat as a trawler the obligation to pay hire will cease".

Judgment
The reversal of this judgment was subsequently upheld by the Privy Council. Maritime National Fish had not been bound not to select the hired trawler, they had merely chosen not to in lieu of only receiving three of the five licenses they had expected:

This establishes clearly that frustration must be the fault of neither party; any supervening event must be unforeseeable and vitiated by entirely external factors.

See also
 Frustration in English law

Notes

Canadian contract case law
English frustration case law
Judicial Committee of the Privy Council cases on appeal from Canada
1935 in Canadian case law